Fredrik Axel Schiotz (15 June 1901 – 25 February 1989) was an American Lutheran Church leader, president of the Evangelical Lutheran Church, President of the Lutheran World Federation and Presiding Bishop of The American Lutheran Church.

Biography
Fredrik Axel Schiotz was born in Chicago, Illinois. Both his father, Jacob Schiotz, and his mother, Stina Akerholt, had been immigrants from Norway. He graduated from St. Olaf College in Northfield, Minnesota (class of 1924) and earned a master's degree at Luther Theological Seminary in Saint Paul, Minnesota.

In 1954 Schiotz was elected president of the historically Norwegian-American Evangelical Lutheran Church. In 1960, the Evangelical Lutheran Church along with the United Evangelical Lutheran Church and American Lutheran Church merged to form The American Lutheran Church. Schiotz was elected president of the new body and served as the church's president until the end of 1970. He was the president of the Lutheran World Federation from 1963 to 1970 and the central committee of World Council of Churches from 1961 to 1971.

During the 450th anniversary of the Reformation, he stated that in the past, commemorations were viewed almost as a triumph, and that the Reformation should be celebrated as a thanksgiving to God, his truth and his renewed life. He welcomed the announcement of Pope Paul VI to celebrate the 1900th anniversary of the death of the Apostle Peter and Apostle Paul, and promised the participation and cooperation in the festivities.

Selected bibliography
One Man's Story (Minneapolis, MN: Augsburg Fortress Publishers. September 1981)

References

Other sources
 Nelson,  Clifford E. and E. Clifford Nelson Lutherans in North America (Minneapolis, MN: Augsburg Fortress Publishers. 1980)

External links
JAO Preus, Fred Schiotz, Robert Marshall, Chicago Nov 17, 1969
ELCA Archives
https://web.archive.org/web/20141219085603/http://www.luthersem.edu/archives/collections/rg11/schiotz_fredrik.aspx?m=4507

1901 births
1989 deaths
St. Olaf College alumni
Presiding bishops
20th-century American Lutheran clergy
Clergy from Chicago
American people of Norwegian descent
Luther Seminary alumni